The Antonov An-140 is a turboprop regional airliner, designed by the Ukrainian Antonov ASTC bureau as a successor to the Antonov An-24, with extended cargo capacity and the ability to use unprepared airstrips.

Design and development
First flown on 17 September 1997, the 52 passenger An-140 is manufactured at the main production line in Kharkiv by KHDABP, in Samara by Aviakor, and assembled under license by Iran Aircraft Manufacturing Industrial Company (HESA) in Iran as the IrAn-140. Assembly in Kazakhstan has also been discussed in tri-partite discussions between the Kazakh government, Ukraine and Russia.

An identical-in-appearance airplane with the same name is also manufactured by Aviakor in Samara, Russia. Since Ukraine is no longer  cooperating with Russia in aircraft production, the Aviakor version of the An-140 is manufactured entirely with Russian components. The P&W Canada engine option is not offered.

Variants

An-140T (Tactical airlifter) The An-140T is a light military transport aircraft developed on the basis of the An-140-100 turboprop airliner. The An-140T features a rear ramp for loading/unloading of cargo and personnel. The An-140S is the same military transport aircraft equipped with a larger loading/unloading hatch. In 2013 Aviakor announced the first deliveries of the An-140T/S aircraft to the Russian Ministry of Defense were scheduled for 2017 as the replacement for the current fleet of 300 An-24 and An-26 airplanes operated by the Russian Air Force. However, in 2014, Russian deputy prime minister for military–industrial complex, Dmitry Rogozin, announced that Russia was abandoning the An-140T/S project due to worsening relations with Ukraine and would pursue development of the Ilyushin Il-112.

An-140TK (convertible cargo-passenger)

An-140 VIPRegional aircraft An-140 in VIP-configuration is designed to carry up to 30 passengers in comfort. The passenger compartment of the aircraft can be divided into two or three zones—the exclusive lounge, equipped with four comfortable seats with audio and video, business class and economy class cabin, in which it has 24 standard seats with a standard aisle.

An-140-100The AN-140-100 aircraft differs from the basic version with the larger wingspan. Can be built for civilian, military and special purpose: maritime patrol, medical, aerial photography, geological exploration, freight etc.

HESA IrAn-140 The IrAn-140 is a license-built version of the An-140, assembled by HESA in Shahin Shahr, Iran, from complete knock-down kits supplied by Antonov. , 13 aircraft per year were planned to be constructed. There were plans to produce maritime patrol (IrAn-140MP) and freighter (IrAn-140T) versions. 100 aircraft in total were planned to be built; 20 of them were to be acquired by the Iranian government for border patrol and surveillance.

On 9 November 2010, during his opening speech of the Kish air show, the Iranian transport minister announced that 14 IrAn-140 aircraft had so far been completed; the first six entered commercial service on 19 February 2011. However, after the Sepahan Airlines Flight 5915 crash, An-140 operations were banned by the CAO of Iran, with all remaining Iranian-registered examples grounded. On 23 August 2014 Brigadier General Hossein Dehqan, Iran's Minister of Defence, announced full compliance of IrAn-140 airplanes with ICAO requirements and that the aircraft is certified by Iran's Civil Aviation Organisation.

Operators

As of December 2022, 23 An-140 and further 10 HESA IrAn-140 have been built for airline and government service, including prototypes. Of these 33 aircraft, only 9 remain in active service. While 20 further aircraft are stored, four An-140 were lost in accidents.

Accidents and incidents
Since its introduction in 2002, the Antonov An-140 has been involved in five accidents and incidents, including four hull-loss accidents, resulting in 111 occupant fatalities. Of the aircraft lost, three were HESA IrAn-140 aircraft built in Iran from knock-down kits supplied by Antonov.
 On 23 December 2002, Aeromist Kharkiv Flight 2137, an An-140 (UR-14003) carrying many of Ukraine's top aviation designers and engineers, crashed into a mountainside as it was preparing to land at Isfahan, Iran, killing all 44 on board. The delegation was to have attended the inauguration ceremonies for the first HESA IrAn-140 airframe. The probable cause was controlled flight into terrain (CFIT) due to incorrect use of the cockpit satellite navigation system.
 On 12 August 2005, a Safiran Airlines HESA IrAn-140 diverted to Arak Airport due to an engine failure. During landing, the aircraft overran the runway and was badly damaged. There were no fatalities. The cause of the engine failure appeared to be technical problems with the fuel control unit. The airframe was eventually repaired in the early 2010s and is to be used by HESA as a test bed for the future versions of the aircraft. After the Arak incident, Safiran Airlines returned its two remaining examples to HESA. 
 On 23 December 2005, Azerbaijan Airlines Flight 217, an An-140-100 (4K-AZ48), crashed into the Caspian Sea at CA 22:40, killing all 23 passengers and crew on board. Investigations discovered that three independent gyroscopes were not providing stabilized heading and attitude information to the crew early in the flight. The airline grounded its remaining An-140 airplanes, and cancelled plans to purchase more of the type from Ukraine.
 On 15 February 2009, an IrAn-140-100 (test registration HESA 90-04) crashed at Shahin Shahr, Isfahan Province, Iran, during a training flight, killing the five crew.
 On 10 August 2014, Sepahan Airlines Flight 5915, an IrAn-140-100 (registration EP-GPA), crashed shortly after taking off from Tehran Mehrabad International Airport. The aircraft was on a domestic service to Tabas. According to initial reports, around 40 passengers and 8 crew members were on board the aircraft, which broke up and burst into flames. It was reported that the aircraft suffered an engine failure shortly after take-off. There were 10 survivors. The aircraft was built in 2008 and was fitted with the Klimov TV3-117VMA-SBM1 engines. Survivors reported that the number two engine had stopped during the take off. Following this crash, the Iranian IrAn-140 fleet was grounded, pending outcome of the investigation. On 23 August 2014 Brigadier General Hossein Dehqan, Iran's Minister of Defence, announced full compliance of IrAn-140 airplanes (Iranian licensed production of An-140-100) with ICAO requirements and that the aircraft is certified by Iran's Civil Aviation Organisation. The announcement was made due to the investigation of IrAn-140 crash in Tehran on 10 August 2014.

Specifications (An-140 AI-30 engines)

See also

References

External links

 AN-140 / The AN-140 Regional Passenger Aircraft – Antonov
 AN-140 – Kharkiv State Aircraft Manufacturing Company

An-140
1990s Ukrainian airliners
High-wing aircraft
Aircraft first flown in 1997
Twin-turboprop tractor aircraft